James "Jim" Park (born June 22, 1952) is a Canadian former professional ice hockey goaltender and the creator of a series of instructional tapes for hockey goaltenders entitled "The Puck Stops Here" (1986).

Early life 
Park was born in Toronto. As a youth, he played in the 1964 and 1965 Quebec International Pee-Wee Hockey Tournaments with a minor ice hockey team from Don Mills, and then the Toronto Shopsy's team.

Career 
Between 1975 and 1978, Park played three seasons and 54 games with the Indianapolis Racers of the World Hockey Association (WHA). He later operated his own academy for goaltenders. Some of his students went on to have professional careers playing ice hockey.

Personal life 
Park is the father of former Ontario MPP Lindsey Park.

Awards and honors

References

External links
 

1952 births
Living people
Indianapolis Racers players
Canadian expatriate ice hockey players in the United States
Canadian ice hockey goaltenders
Cornwall Royals (QMJHL) players
Des Moines Capitols players
Fort Wayne Komets players
Fort Worth Texans players
Indianapolis Checkers players
Jersey Devils players
Los Angeles Blades (WHL) players
Mohawk Valley Comets players
Oklahoma City Blazers (1965–1977) players
Phoenix Roadrunners (PHL) players
Richmond Robins players
Ice hockey people from Toronto